Lindau-Reutin station is a junction station in the town of Lindau (Lake Constance), where the Aeschach curve branches off from the Lindau–Bludenz line. It is also a border station with Austria. In the course of the reconstruction of the Lindau rail hub, which began in 2016, the rail facilities, which were last used only as a goods station, were expanded into Lindau's new long-distance train station, which went into operation in 2020. In contrast to the terminus station Lindau-Insel (until 2020: Lindau Hbf), which opened in 1854, the station in the most populous district Reutin is a through station on the mainland. A station for local passenger services opened at Lindau-Reutin as Lindau-Lokalbahnhof in 1876 and was known as Lindau-Ost from 1911 but the last passenger services to it ended in 1980. The station building is located on Bregenzer Straße, on a level with Berliner Platz.

Operations 
Since the timetable change on December 13, 2020, six connections are offered daily in the direction of Munich and Zurich as EuroCity-Express (ECE) and Eurocity (EC), with a change of train class in Reutin. Thanks to the expansion of tilting technology, the electrification of the route between Geltendorf and Lindau and the elimination of the previous traction and direction change in Lindau, they are about 20 minutes faster between the two cities than before.

From the beginning of July to mid-September 2021, a pair of trains will run on Saturdays on the Bregenz–Lindau-Reutlin–Berlin route as ICE 1208/1209.

In addition, Lindau-Reutin is served by the S1 of the Vorarlberg S-Bahn as well as ÖBB regional trains, which passed the station without stopping until 2020. The remaining regional services continued to stop only at Lindau-Insel station, with the exception of the RE 7, which was extended to Lindau-Reutin in 2020. The RE 5, RE 7 and RE 70 were rerouted to Lindau-Reutin and a new service, the RE 96, from Munich to Lindau-Reutin via Memmingen and Lindau-Insel was introduced in 2021.

Long distance services 
The Lindau-Reutin station is served by the following DB-Fernverkehr services:

Regional services 
The station ist served by the following regional, Vorarlberg S-Bahn, and St. Gallen S-Bahn services:

References 

Railway stations in Bavaria
International border crossings
Lindau (Bodensee)
Buildings and structures in Lindau (district)
Vorarlberg S-Bahn stations
Railway stations in Germany opened in 2020